The 2019 Challenge Cup Final was the deciding game of the Rugby Football League's 2019 Challenge Cup competition, the 118th staging of the competition. The match was held at Wembley Stadium in London on 24 August 2019 with  kick off at 15:00. The final was contested by the Warrington Wolves and St Helens, the first time the two sides have met in a major final.

Background
The two sides have never met in a Challenge Cup final before. It had been 11 years since St Helens last won in the Challenge Cup Final, and despite final appearances in 2016 and 2018, Warrington have not triumphed since 2012.

Warrington came into the game on the back of five straight defeats in Super League, and with being defeated by the Catalans Dragons in last season's final. On the other hand, Saints were leading the way at the top of the table, losing just three games all season, 2
two of which came at the London Broncos (one of those games going to golden point extra time), with the other, away to Catalans. They had not lost a home game so far in the season.

Route to the final

Warrington Wolves
Warrington escaped the sixth round with a narrow 26–24 victory over rivals Wigan. Warrington then faced Hull KR in the quarter finals winning 28 points to 22. Warrington's semi-final opposition was also a Kingston-upon-Hull side, this time Hull F.C., to which they secured their most comfortable win en route to the final.

St Helens
St Helens faced Super League side Huddersfield Giants in the sixth round, beating them 22–16. A 48–10 thrashing of Wakefield Trinity in the quarter finals saw the Saints progress to the semis where they faced Championship side Halifax and getting a comfortable victory to progress to the final.

Match details

Teams

References

External links

Challenge Cup finals
2019 in English rugby league
2019 in Welsh rugby league
2019 in French rugby league
2019 in Scottish sport
2019 in Irish sport
2019 in Serbian sport
Warrington Wolves matches
St Helens R.F.C. matches
August 2019 sports events in the United Kingdom
2019 sports events in London